Turkey's media purge after the failed coup d'état on July 15, 2016 resulted in the shutdown of at least 131 media outlets and the arrest of 117 journalists – at least 35 of whom have been indicted for "membership in a terror group".

In the wake of the attempted putsch, President Recep Tayyip Erdogan's government closed down media companies linked to exiled cleric Fethullah Gülen and his Hizmet Movement. Turkey's General Directorate for Press, Broadcasting, and Information also revoked at least 620 journalists' accreditations.

As a result of the crackdown, 2,308 media workers and journalists have lost their job. Turkey's media purge has also occurred online: regulators blocked at least 30 news-related websites. Websites not linked to Gülen's movement, such as Wikileaks and the Turkish satirical weekly Leman, are among those blocked inside Turkey. In addition 48 online news stories from outlets including The Independent have been censored. Three stories were about corruptions allegations involving the president's son Bilal Erdogan. Wikipedia was blocked from April 2017 to January 2020.

Chronology of Purge 
On Thursday July 21, six days after the failed coup d’état, Turkey’s parliament approved a bill declaring a state of emergency allowing the government to rule by decree for three months. On the same day, Erdogan announced that the European Convention on Human Rights had been suspended.

Under the Turkish constitution, during a state of emergency, the government can overturn the exercise of fundamental rights and freedoms, as long as it respects international laws. However, the 15th article of the Turkish Constitution states that the ECHR cannot be suspended.

In this context and that of a wider purge in Turkey with 40,000 arrests and 160,000 suspensions of officials, President Erdogan initiated a purge of media and journalists suspected of sympathy with the Gülen movement. On July 27th, Erdogan published a decree in Turkey's official government gazette, ordering the shutdown of three news agencies, 16 TV channels, 23 radio channels, 45 newspapers, 15 magazines and 29 publishing houses (see list below).

By the force of the state of emergency, "all goods, assets, rights, documents and papers [belonging to those media outlets] will be transferred, free of charge, to Turkish treasury with no appeal to be made". Also, 89 arrest warrants were issued for journalists who were alleged plotters in the failed attempt to overthrow the government.

During the same week, 17 journalists were charged with membership in Gülen’s movement, which the government considers a terrorist group.  On August 5, this number increased to 36 journalists indicted for the same charge. The Turkish government justified the arrests for security reasons and said the journalists were being investigated and prosecuted for participating in criminal activities. On August 27, the Platform for Independent Journalism (P24), a press freedom group, said the number of journalists arrested since the coup was 108.

Reactions 
Press freedom groups have condemned the crackdown. The Turkish representative for Reporters Without Borders called the arrests "a witch hunt against journalists". David Kaye, the UN special rapporteur on the right to freedom of expression said that "the attempted coup cannot justify such a broad attack against almost all voices, not just critical ones but analytic and journalistic."

"The disregard for any assurance of due process is flagrant and only contributes to the extreme levels of insecurity affecting all those working to inform people of the ongoing crisis in the country," said Dunja Mijatović, the media freedom representative of the Organisation for Security and Cooperation in Europe's representative on media freedom.

The Committee to Protect Journalist's program coordinator for central Asia, Nina Ognianova, said that the "scale of this rout of the media is staggering." She added: "The government is exploiting a failed coup to silence the critical press when Turkey most needs pluralistic media."

The Turkey director at Human Rights Watch, Emma Sinclair-Webb, added to the criticism "In the absence of any evidence of their role or participation in the violent attempt to overthrow the government, we strongly condemn this accelerated assault on the media, which further undermines Turkey’s democratic credentials", she said.

Appendices

Names of the 50 journalists or media workers indicted between July 18 and September 22 
(Most are charged for membership to Gulen’s movement, some for being pro-PKK)
 Mümtaz'er Türköne, a former columnist for the shuttered newspaper Zaman and its sister, English-language publication Today's Zaman, who stands accused of "serving the goals" of the Hizmet movement
 Alaattin Güner faces charges of "membership in an armed terrorist organization"
 Şeref Yılmaz, vice-chair of the broadcaster Irmak TV's board of directors, faces charges of "membership in an armed terrorist organization"
 Ahmet Metin Sekizkardeş, vice-president of Cihan Media, faces charges of "membership in an armed terrorist organization"	
 Faruk Akkan, news editor for Cihan News Agency, faces charges of "membership in an armed terrorist organization"
 Mehmet Özdemir faces charges of "membership in an armed terrorist organization"
 Fevzi Yazıcı, a former design editor for Zaman and a columnist for the daily Yarına Bakış, faces charges of "membership in an armed terrorist organization"
 Zafer Özsoy faces charges of "membership in an armed terrorist organization"
 Cuma Kayaand faces charges of "membership in an armed terrorist organization"
 Hakan Taşdelen faces charges of "membership in an armed terrorist organization"
 Hüseyin Turan, a shareholder in the Feza Media Group, faces charges of "aiding a terrorist organization without being a member"
 Murat Avcıoğlu faces charges of "aiding a terrorist organization without being a member"
 Ayşenur Parlak: former Zaman newspaper reporter
 Erdal Şen,  former Ankara correspondent for the daily newspaper Habertürk
 Arda Akın, a journalist for the daily newspaper Hürriyet
 Aslı Erdoğan, columnist and a member of the suspended, pro-Kurdish newspaper Özgür Gündem's advisory board
 Bilir Kaya, editor: of Özgür Gündem, the pro-Kurdish newspaper reported on its website
 İnan Kızılkaya, news editor Özgür Gündem
 Ercan Gün former Fox TV news editor
 Erdem Mühirci, a reporter for the pro-Kurdish Dicle News Agency (DİHA)
 Necmiye Alpay, a writer, linguist, and member of the advisory board of the shuttered, pro-Kurdish daily newspaper Özgür Gündem
 Sabahattin Koyuncu, province correspondent for the pro-Kurdish Dicle News Agency (DİHA)
 Arap Turan, pro-Kurdish newspaper Özgür Gündem
 Ferit Toprak, pro-Kurdish newspaper Özgür Gündem 
 Mutlu Çölgeçen, columnist for the defunct Meydan newspaper Atilla Taş
 Nazlı Ilıcak. a columnist with the defunct newspaper Özgür Düşünce, and a commentator for the defunct broadcaster Can Erzincan TV
 Seyit Kılıç, a reporter for the state broadcaster TRT
 Bayram Kaya, reporter for the defunct daily newspaper Yeni Hayat
 Cihan Acar, a photojournalist with the defunct daily newspaper Bugün
 Bünyamin Köseli, a reporter for the defunct news magazine Aksiyon
 Emre Soncan, a reporter for the defunct daily Zaman
 Mustafa Erkan Acar, a reporter with the defunct Cihan News Agency
 Cemal Azmi Kalyoncu reporter formerly with the daily newspaper Zaman
 Abdullah Kılıç, formerly with Habertürk TV, and the recently closed daily newspaper Meydan
 Habip Güler, a former reporter for Zaman
 Cuma Ulus, a former coordinator of the defunct daily newspaper Millet
 Hanım Büşra Erdal, a former reporter for Zaman, currently with Özgür Düşünce
 Hüseyin Aydın, a former reporter for the Cihan News Agency
 Haşim Söylemez, a reporter formerly with Zaman and Aksiyon
 Ali Akkuş, a former editor of Zaman
 Yakup Çetin, a former reporter for Zaman
Ufuk Şanlı, a columnist formerly with the daily Vatan, currently with the US-based website Al-Monitor
 Ali Bulaç, from Zaman
 Şahin Alpay, from Zaman
 Ahmet Turan Alkan, from Zaman
 Mustafa Ünal, from Zaman
 Nuriye Ural, from Zaman
 Lalezer Sarıibrahimoğlu (pen name: Lale Kemal), from Zaman

131 media outlets shutdown on Erdogan’s July 27 decree 

Source:

News Agencies
 Cihan Haber Ajansı
 Muhabir Haber Ajansı
 SEM Haber Ajans
TV Channels
 Barış TV
 Bugün TV
 Can Erzincan TV
 Dünya TV
 HİRA TV
 Irmak TV
 Kanal 124
 Kanaltürk
 MC TV
 Mehtap TV
 Samanyolu Haber
 Merkür TV
 Samanyolu TV
 SRT Televizyonu 
 Tuna Shopping TV
 Yumurcak TV 
Radio Stations 
 Aksaray Mavi Radyo 
 Aktüel Radyo
 Berfin FM 
 Burç FM
 Cihan Radyo
 Dünya Radyo 
 Esra Radyo 
 Haber Radyo Ege
 Herkül FM 
 Jest FM 1
 Kanaltürk Radyo 
 Radyo 
 Radyo Aile Rehberi 
 Radyo Bamteli 
 Radyo Cihan 
 Radyo Fıkıh 
 Radyo Küre
 Radyo Mehtap 
 Radyo Nur 
 Radyo Şemşik 
 Samanyolu Haber Radyosu
 Umut FM
 Yağmur FM
Newspapers (local) 
 Adana Haber Gazetesi
 Adana Medya Gazetesi 
 Akdeniz Türk 
 Şuhut'un Sesi Gazetesi 
 Kurtuluş Gazetesi 
 Lider Gazetesi 
 İscehisar Durum Gazetesi 
 Türkeli Gazetesi 
 Antalya Gazetesi 
 Yerel Bakış Gazetesi 
 Nazar 
 Batman Gazetesi 
 Batman Postası Gazetesi 
 Batman Doğuş Gazetesi 
 Bingöl Olay Gazetesi 
 İrade Gazetesi 
 İskenderun Olay Gazetesi 
 Ekonomi 
 Ege'de Son Söz Gazetesi 
 Demokrat Gebze 
 Kocaeli Manşet 
 Bizim Kocaeli 
 Haber Kütahya Gazetesi 
 Gediz Gazetesi 
 Zafer Gazetesi 
 Hisar Gazetesi 
 Turgutlu Havadis Gazetesi
 Milas Feza Gazetesi 
 Türkiye'de Yeni Yıldız Gazetesi 
 Hakikat Gazetesi 
 Urfa Haber Ajansı Gazetesi 
 Ajans 
 Gazetesi 
 Yeni Emek 
 Banaz Postası Gazetesi 
 Son Nokta Gazetesi 
 Merkür Haber Gazetesi 
Newspapers (national) 
 Millet Gazetesi 
 Bugün Gazetesi
 Meydan Gazetesi 
 Özgür Düşünce Gazetesi 
 Taraf
 Yarına Bakış
 Yeni Hayat 
 Zaman Gazetesi 
 Today's Zaman 
Magazines 
 Akademik Araştırmalar Dergisi 
 Aksiyon 
 Asya Pasifik Dergisi 
 Bisiklet Çocuk Dergisi 
 Diyalog Avrasya Dergisi 
 Ekolife Dergisi
 Ekoloji Dergisi 
 Fountain Dergisi 
 Gonca Dergisi 
 Gül Yaprağı Dergisi 
 Nokta
 Sızıntı
 Yağmur Dergisi 
 Yeni Ümit 
 Zirve Dergisi
Publishing Houses and Distribution Companies
 Altınburç Yayınları
 Burak Basın Yayın Dağıtım
 Define Yayınları
 Dolunay Eğitim Yayın Dağıtım
 Giresun Basın Yayın Dağıtım
 Gonca Yayınları
 Gülyurdu Yayınları
 GYV Yayınları
 Işık Akademi
 Işık Özel Eğitim Yayınlar
 Işık Yayınları
 İklim Basın Yayın Pazarlama
 Kaydırak Yayınları
 Kaynak Yayınlar
 Kervan Basın Yayıncılık
 Kuşak Yayınları
 Muştu Yayınları
 Nil Yayınları
 Rehber Yayınları
 Sürat Basım Yayın Reklamcılık Eğitim Araçları
 Sütun Yayınları
 Şahdamar Yayınları
 Ufuk Basın Yayın Haber Ajans Pazarlama
 Ufuk Yayınları
 Waşanxaneya Nil
 Yay Basın Dağıtım
 Yeni Akademi Yayınları
 Yitik Hazine Yayınları
 Zambak Basın Yayın Eğitim Turizm

See also 
2016–present purges in Turkey

References

External links 
 Committee to Protect Journalists
 Reporters Without Broders
 Turkey Purge

media
Political and cultural purges
Mass media freedom in Turkey
Recep Tayyip Erdoğan
Freedom of expression in Turkey
Mass media in Turkey
July 2016 events in Turkey
August 2016 events in Turkey
Scares